Jean Meyer Barth (born February 8, 1942) is a French-Mexican historian and author, known for his writings on early 20th-century Mexican history. He has published extensively on the Mexican Revolution and Cristero War, the history of Nayarit, and on the caudillo Manuel Lozada. He is a faculty member at the Centro de Investigación y Docencia Económicas, and a Guggenheim Fellow.

Biography
Jean Meyer was born in Nice. He obtained bachelor's and master's degrees at the Sorbonne University. He has taught at Sorbonne, Perpignan, the University of Paris, the Colegio de México, the Colegio de Michoacán, and the Centro de Investigación y Docencia Económicas. He has done extensive research on the Cristero War and written books on the subject for the University of Cambridge and the Universidad de Guadalajara. He also founded the Institute of Mexican Studies at the University of Perpignan in France.

His major publications deal with conservative peasants in nineteenth- and twentieth-century Mexico. His work on the Cristero War is crucial for the understanding of this major uprising in Mexico following the enforcement of the anticlerical articles of the 1917 Constitution of Mexico.  He has also published important works about Manuel Lozada, a nineteenth-century regional leader in Nayarit who fought for the rights of mestizo and indigenous peasants. Historian Eric Van Young reviewed Meyer's , saying "the major essays are beautifully written, talky, strongly rhetorical, slightly wistful in tone, and intensely romantic and hardheaded at one and the same time, as with much of the best French annaliste history." He has also written on Soviet and Russian history.

He is a recognized authority on the immediate post-revolutionary period in Mexico and was chosen to write the general article on Mexico in the 1920s for the Cambridge History of Latin America.

His cousin is the Abel Prize-winning mathematician Yves Meyer.

Publications
 
 
 
 
 
 
 
 
 
 
 
 
 
 
 
 
 
 
 
 El conflicto entre la Iglesia y el Estado. México, ed. Clío, 1997.
 Hidalgo, México, Clio, 1996.
 El campesino en la historia rusa y soviética. México, Fondo de Cultura Económica, 1996.
 Mascota en la gran década nacional 1857-1867. Guadalajara, CEMCA, Universidad de Guadalajara, 1994.
 Atonalisco, Nayarit, una historia documental 1695-1935. CEMCA-INI, 1994.
 Visita a las misiones del Nayarit. CEMCA-INI 1993.
 Con Thomas Calvo, Xalisco, la voz de un pueblo en el siglo XVI. CEMCA/CIESAS.
 Con Juan José Doñan, Antología del cuento cristero. Guadalajara, Secretaría de Cultura de Jalisco, 1993.
 Egohistorias. El amor a Clío. México, CEMCA, 1993 (editor)
 Los tambores de Calderón (1810-1811). México, Editorial Diana, 1993.
 La Cristiada en Colima. Colima, Instituto Cultural, 1993.
 Ramírez Flores, José. La Revolución maderista en Jalisco Universidad de Guadalajara, CEMCA, 1992.
 La Revolución Mexicana. México, ed. Jus. 1992.
 "Revolution and Reconstruction in the 1920s" in Mexico Since Independence, Leslie Bethell, ed. New York: Cambridge University Press 1991, pp. 201–240.
 El campesino en la historia rusa y soviética. México, Fondo de Cultura (1991).
 El partido católico nacional. por E. J. Correa, F.C.E. 1991. 
 La perestroika, 1991, México, Fondo de Cultura Económica, 2 vols. 
 Testimonio cristero. Memorias de don Ezequiel Mendoza. México, ed. Jus.
 Les chrétiens d'Amérique Latine XIXe et XXe S, 1991, París, Desclée.
 De cantón de Tepic a Estado de Nayarit, Colección de Documentos para la historia de Nayarit, CEMCA/Universidad de Guadalajara, 1990.
 La tierra de Manuel Lozada, Colección de Documentos para la historia de Nayarit, CEMCA/Universidad de Guadalajara, 1989.
 Nuevas Mutaciones, el siglo XVIII, Colección de Documentos para la historia de Nayarit, CEMCA/Universidad de Guadalajara, 1990.
 Historia de los cristianos en América Latina Siglos XIX y XX. México, Editorial Vuelta, 1989.
 A la voz del rey. México, Cal y Arena, 1989.
 El Gran Nayar. México 1989. CEMCA/Universidad de Guadalajara, 1989.
 La casa en el bosque: las "trojes" de Michoacán. México, El Colegio de Michoacán, 1987.
 La vitivinicultura en México. México, El Colegio de Michoacán, 1985.
 Zamora ayer, México 1985.
 Esperando a Lozada, México, Secretaría de Educación Pública, 1983.
 Champs du pouvoir, champs du savoir editor y coautor CNRS 1982.
 Coraje Cristero. México, Universidad Autónoma Metropolitana, 1981.
 El sinarquismo, ¿un fascismo mexicano? México, J. Mortiz, 1979.
 Intellectuels et Etat au Mexique au XXe siècle C.N.R.S. 1979.
 Historia de la Revolución mexicana 1924-1929, 2 volúmenes. México 1978, Colegio de México.
 Le Sinarquisme, un fascisme mexicain? Paris, Hachette 1977.
 The Cristero Rebellion. The Mexican people between Church and State. Cambridge University 1976.
 La Christiade; 1'Etat et le peuple dans la révolution mexicaine. Paris 1975, Payot.
 Apocalypse et Révolution au Mexique, Paris 1974 Gallimard archives.
 La Cristiada (3 vols.) México 1973-1975, 20 edición en 2000.
 Problemas agrarios y movimientos campesinos. México 1973.
 La révolution mexicaine. Paris, Calmann Lévy, 1973.

References

External links
 Profile at the Academia Mexicana de Historia (Mexican Academy of History)
 Center of Iberian and Latin American Research at the Université de Perpignan
 Cine globalizado - An article for Literal, Latin American Voices

1942 births
Living people
French emigrants to Mexico
Naturalized citizens of Mexico
20th-century Mexican historians
Mexican male writers
Academic staff of El Colegio de México
University of Paris alumni
French male non-fiction writers
21st-century Mexican historians
University of Paris people
20th-century French historians
21st-century French historians
Historians of Mexico
Academic staff of the University of Paris